Fábio Vidrago (born 28 October 1988) is a Portuguese handball player for the Portuguese national team.

He represented Portugal at the 2020 European Men's Handball Championship.

References

External links

1988 births
Living people
Portuguese male handball players
Sportspeople from Braga
S.L. Benfica handball players
Universiade medalists in handball
Universiade gold medalists for Portugal
Medalists at the 2015 Summer Universiade